Ben's Menu is an Australian television cooking series which airs on Network Ten. It started on 8 September 2014.

Presented by Ben Milbourne from the fourth season of MasterChef Australia, the show sometimes features a guest, cooking and discussing food recipes. It is filmed at Ben's farmhouse in northwest Tasmania.

References

External links

Network 10 original programming
Australian cooking television series
2014 Australian television series debuts
2017 Australian television series endings
English-language television shows